Courts of Mississippi include:
;State courts of Mississippi
Supreme Court of Mississippi
Mississippi Court of Appeals
Mississippi Chancery Courts
Mississippi Circuit Courts (22 circuits)
Mississippi County Courts
Mississippi Justice Courts
Mississippi Municipal Courts
Mississippi Drug Courts
Mississippi Youth Courts

Federal courts located in Mississippi
United States District Court for the Northern District of Mississippi
United States District Court for the Southern District of Mississippi

Former federal courts of Mississippi
United States District Court for the District of Mississippi (extinct, subdivided on June 18, 1838)

Footnotes

Further reading
 David M. Hargrove, Mississippi's Federal Courts: A History. Jackson, MS: University Press of Mississippi, 2019.

External links
National Center for State Courts – directory of state court websites.

Courts in the United States
Mississippi state courts